Alexis Patricio Norambuena Ruz (born 31 March 1984 in Santiago) is a former Palestinian footballer who played as a defender.

He retired in early 2019.

International career
Norambuena was born and raised in Chile to Chilean parents of Palestinian heritage. He made his debut for Palestine in a 2–1 victory versus Yemen on 18 June 2012.

International goals
Scores and results list Palestine's goal tally first.

Honours

Club
Unión Española
 Primera División de Chile (1): 2005 Apertura

Jagiellonia Białystok
 Polish Cup: 2009/10
 Polish SuperCup: 2010

GKS Bełchatów
 I Liga (1) : 2013/14

References

External links
 
 Profile at theplayersagent.com
 
 Official site profile 
 
 

1984 births
Living people
Footballers from Santiago
Chilean people of Palestinian descent
Chilean footballers
Palestinian people of Chilean descent
Citizens of the State of Palestine through descent
Palestinian footballers
Palestine international footballers
Unión Española footballers
Ñublense footballers
Jagiellonia Białystok players
GKS Bełchatów players
Deportes La Serena footballers
Shabab Al-Khalil SC players
Deportes Melipilla footballers
Deportes Colina footballers
Chilean Primera División players
Ekstraklasa players
I liga players
Primera B de Chile players
West Bank Premier League players
Segunda División Profesional de Chile players
Chilean expatriate footballers
Palestinian expatriate footballers
Expatriate footballers in Chile
Expatriate footballers in Poland
Palestinian expatriate sportspeople in Poland
Chilean expatriate sportspeople in Poland
2015 AFC Asian Cup players
2019 AFC Asian Cup players
Association football defenders